The Polikarpov I-17 was a Soviet single-seat fighter prototype designed and built by a team headed by Nikolai Polikarpov at the Central Design Bureau (TsKB) in 1934.

Development
The I-17 was a lightweight single-seat low-wing cantilever monoplane. Developed under the design bureau designation TsKB-15 it first flew on 1 September 1934 powered by a 567 kW (760 hp) Hispano-Suiza 12 Ybrs engine. The second prototype designated the TsKB-19 had a revised inward retracting wide-track main landing gear and a Soviet M-100 engine. This second prototype was displayed at the 1936 Salon de l'Aeronautique in Paris. The third prototype designated the TsKB-33 had reduced armament to save weight and a revised engine cooling system, but the further development was abandoned in 1936.

A number of related unbuilt projects were also under development including the I-17Z parasite fighter under the designations TsKB-25 with a M-34RNF engine and the TsKB-43 with a Hispano-Suiza engine, none were built.

Variants
TsKB-15
First prototype I-17 powered by a 567 kW (760 hp) Hispano-Suiza 12 Ybrs engine.
TsKB-19
Second revised I-17 prototype powered by a M-100 engine.
TsKB-25
Unbuilt I-17Z project for a Mikulin AM-34RNF powered parasite fighter.
TsKB-33
Third revised I-17 prototype with reduced armament.
TsKB-43
Unbuilt project with a Hispano-Suiza engine.

Surviving aircraft
One I-17 prototype is on display at the V. P. Chkalov Memorial Museum in Chkalovsk, Russia.

Specifications (TsKB-19)

Notes

References

External links

 I-17 article

1930s Soviet fighter aircraft
I-017